Lycée César Baggio is a senior high school in Lille, France.

It was formed in 1961 when the Collège Technique Baggio was converted into a senior high school.

References

External links

 Lycée César Baggio 
 Cité César Baggio 
 Baggio Prép 

Lycées in Lille